Osicala is a city in the Department of Morazan, Republic of El Salvador. It borders Meanguera to the north, southeast with Delicias de Concepción, and west with Gualococti.
Its climate, due to its elevation, has moderate temperatures (15–20°C, 59–68°F) most of the year.

Economy
People there are dedicated to agriculture. Over the land they grow corn, agave and coffee. Some fruit trees like mangoes, bananas, oranges and limes are also grown.

Rivers
Torola
Osicala
Quebrada Honda

References

Municipalities of the Morazán Department